Milan is a municipality of about 300 people in Le Granit Regional County Municipality in the Estrie region in Quebec, Canada.

The community was established 1877 by Scottish immigrants from Lewis, and originally known as Marsden. Due to confusion with the township of Marston, the community's name was changed to Milan some years later.

Climate

References

Municipalities in Quebec
Incorporated places in Estrie
Le Granit Regional County Municipality